Aasman Mahal is a 1965 Hindi social family drama film directed by K. A. Abbas. Produced for the "Naya Sansar" banner, its story was written by Abbas, and the cinematographer was Ramchandra. The script and dialogues were by Inder Raj Anand. Prithviraj Kapoor's role as the impoverished Nawab, was acclaimed in the film for its "authenticity". Dilip Raj, son of P. Jairaj, played the hero, having earlier acted in Shehar Aur Sapna (1963). The other co-stars were Surekha, David, Nana Palsikar, Anwar Hussain.

The story revolves around a Nawab, who having lost his money, still continues to live in the old traditional style, maintaining a grandeur facade. His son opposes the unrealistic life-style.

Plot
An elderly impoverished Nawab lives in his ancestral Haveli (Mansion). A business man wants to buy it, in order to convert it into a hotel. Though financially in a desperate state, the Nawab refuses to sell his property and clings on to his old-fashioned ideals of nobility. His son, is dissolute and not of much account, but he is able to let go of the aristocratic baggage. He is in love with the daughter of the house help.

Aasman Mahal evokes other stories of a decaying aristocracy like Chekhov's The Cherry Orchard set in Russia and Lampedusa's The Leopard set in Sicily and Premchand's Shatranj Ke Khilari set in Lucknow.

Cast
 Prithviraj Kapoor
 Dilip Raj
 Surekha 
 Nana Palsikar
 Mridula Rani
 David Abraham
 Anwar Hussain
 Madhukar
 Irshad Panjatan
 Rashid Khan

Production
Cited in the Limca Book of Records to be one of the first films to be "shot on location without sets", thereby not making use of "studio" sets. The film shooting took place in its entirety in Hyderabad. Prithviraj Kapoor's acting won him a special "Honor at the Karlovy Awards".

Soundtrack
One of the notable songs by composer J. P. Kaushik from the film, and described as an "introspective" and "philosophical" number, was "Main Aahein Bhar Nahin Sakta". The lyricists were Ali Sardar Jafri and Majaz Lakhnawi, and the singers were Vijaya Majumdar, Mahendra Kapoor, Geeta Dutt and Madhukar.

Songlist

References

External links

1965 films
1960s Hindi-language films
1965 drama films
Films directed by K. A. Abbas
Films scored by J. P. Kaushik
Indian drama films
Hindi-language drama films